Helical may refer to:
 Helix, the mathematical concept for the shape
 Helical engine, a proposed spacecraft propulsion drive
 Helical spring, a coilspring
 Helical plc, a British property company, once a maker of steel bar stock
 Helicoil, a mechanical thread repairing insert
 H-el-ical//, stage name for Hikaru, Japanese singer